Worfield is a village and civil parish in Shropshire in the West Midlands, England. It is north of Bridgnorth and southeast of Telford. The parish, which includes the hamlet of Chesterton, is an extensive one which lies on the River Worfe. The name Worfield comes from its location on the river Worfe and the surrounding countryside (fields).

The manor of Worfield is mentioned in Domesday Book, where it formed part of the Seisdon Hundred of Staffordshire and was held by Hugh of Montgomery, 2nd Earl of Shrewsbury.

History 
The earliest evidence of settlement that is recorded in the Parish is not in Worfield itself but at Chesterton, which today is a hamlet to the east of the village The people living in the Parish between 600BC and 47AD were part of the Celtic tribe, Cornovii. The economy of the Parish started with the Cornovii tribe and was based on agriculture, breeding and trading cattle. The area also gained considerable wealth from controlling the South Cheshire salt-making industry.

Governance 
An electoral ward in the same name exists. This ward stretches north to Kemberton. the total population of the ward taken at the 2011 Census was 3,711.

Places of interest

Davenport House 
Davenport House is a Grade I  listed building built around 1727. It was built by the architect Francis Smith of Warwick for Henry Davenport. It is now used for events such as weddings, conferences and private parties. It is located southwest of Worfield.

Golf club 
Worfield Golf Club has a modern 18 hole course in the Shropshire countryside. The course opened in 1991 and has been continuously developed since then. The course allows play all year round and trolleys or buggies can be used most of the year. The club co-hosted the English Men's Senior Championship in 1999.

The Old Vicarage Hotel and Restaurant 
The Old Vicarage Hotel and Restaurant is located near to Bridgnorth, it is midway between Wolverhampton and Telford only being 1 mile away from the A454 – Wolverhampton to Bridgnorth Road and 2 miles from the A442 – Bridgnorth to Telford Road The Hotel itself has 14 bedrooms and the restaurant at the Old Vicarage is one of the only two restaurants in Shropshire that have three AA rosettes for dining and three red stars. The Inn at Shipley is located in a three-storey Georgian building from 1771, 3.5 miles away from The Old Vicarage and is part of the Brunning and Price chain.

St Peter's Church 

St. Peter's church is thought to be of Saxon origin and founded by Mercian Earl, Leofric, certainly existing since the 12th Century.

The church is perhaps best known for its fine spire, which at one stage was seriously deteriorating along with the six church bells in the tower that were deemed too dangerous to ring. A huge amount of fundraising took place to restore the spire and bells to their present-day condition.

Although there have been changes to the church over the centuries some of its original features still remain. The original wooden doors leading into the church date back to the 12th Century. These doors are historically important as they are the earliest evidence of the use of ironwork for decoration. The doors in St Peter's Church are one of the only five picture doors left in England.

The most prominent features of the interior are the Bromley tombs. The earliest was built for George Bromley, a prominent judge of the Elizabethan period and brother of Thomas Bromley, the Lord Chancellor. He acquired property through marriage to Joan Waverton, heiress to the Hallon estate, to the west of Worfield. The later and more impressive tomb was built for their second son, Edward Bromley, another important judge who was appointed a Baron of the Exchequer and is portrayed in judicial dress.

There are a variety of war memorials inside the church:

 Shield-shaped metal and wood plaque to a man who died of fever serving in the 1885 Egyptian campaign and two men who died in the Boer War.
 Brass tablet to four Old Boys of the former Worfield Grammar School killed in the Boer War, incorporating image of a chalice to represent one the school additionally donated to the church.
 Wall tablet to Second Lieutenant Eden Marindin, KSLI, died of wounds in World War I.
 Brass wall tablet to Major Frank Harvey Corbett, Royal Field Artillery, killed in World War I, with his battlefield grave marker cross removed from his burial place in France.
 Stone plaque with marble surround to men of the parish who died serving in World War I.
 Stone plaque to those who died in World War II.

The old churchyard contains the war graves of 3 soldiers of World War I and the attached church cemetery those of 3 World War II soldiers.
The World War II general, Sir Oliver Leese (1894–1978), whose home was at Lower Hall in the village from his marriage in 1930 until 1973, is buried at the church.

Literary connection 
Stableford, within the parish, became home (at Hay's House) of the parents of novelist P.G. Wodehouse (1881-1975) after previously living in Dulwich, south London. Wodehouse returned there during holidays from boarding school between the ages of 14 and 21, when the family relocated to Cheltenham. He came to know the area quite well and it became one of the major sources for composite settings (with places from other counties) for his novels; he is thought to have based the fictional village of Worbury on Worfield and Eckleton on Ackleton, another hamlet of the parish.

Schools 
Worfield has a primary school, Worfield Endowed CE Primary School, established in 1846. It is located on the main high street that leads to St.Peters church. The River Worfe runs through the school grounds. As a Church of England school the education has a strong Christian base.

Worfield's nearest secondary School is Bridgnorth Endowed School, a specialist technology school which is about 5 miles away from the centre of Worfield.

Climate 
This tables shows that the average highest temperature is 21 degrees between July and August and the average lowest temperatures occur between January and February at 0 degrees Celsius.

Crime rates 
According to police statistics Worfield's crime and Anti-social behaviour (ASB) rates are classed as average (68% of areas have an average crime level), compared to the rest of England and Wales. February 2012 had the highest crime rate in over a year, all crimes that occurred in this month were recorded and grouped into crime types:
 2 reported burglaries.
 1 reported anti-social behaviour incident.
 2 reported other thefts (does not include shoplifting)

Television and radio 
The main radio stations that are either based in Worfield or broadcast to the area are, BBC Radio Shropshire 96FM,Free Radio Shropshire & Black Country 103.1FM, Kic FM, Sunshine 855 Radio and WCR FM The local TV news programmes for Worfield are BBC Midlands Today and ITV Central News

See also 
 Listed buildings in Worfield

References

External links 

 Worfield Village Hall
 Worfield Golf Club
 St. Peter's Church Worfield
 

Villages in Shropshire
Golf clubs and courses in Shropshire
Civil parishes in Shropshire